"Night Spots" is a 1979 song by The Cars from their second studio album, Candy-O. It was written by Ric Ocasek.

Background
"Night Spots" was a leftover from The Cars' first album, The Cars. The original version, recorded around the time of The Cars, according to the Just What I Needed: The Cars Anthology liner notes, "has a sinister, stripped-down feel that anticipates the more experimental direction of later Cars music." This version remained unreleased until it appeared on the Just What I Needed: The Cars Anthology compilation album.

Reception
"Night Spots" has generally received positive reception. AllMusic critic said that the band "rocks out on ... 'Night Spots'", and in the Billboard review of Candy-O, "Night Spots" was noted as one of the "best cuts". Rolling Stone critic Tom Carson said, "In 'Nightspots,' Greg Hawkes' synthesizer jabs and jumps like the flashing lights on a rainy, late-night highway, and the tune's hopped-up rhythms and stuttering singing have a tense, jittery momentum that's exactly right."

Covers
 The Cautions covered "Night Spots" for the tribute album Substitution Mass Confusion: A Tribute to The Cars.
 Johny Dey covered the song for the tribute album Just What We Needed: A Tribute To The Cars.

References

External links
 https://www.youtube.com/watch?v=hu5xiqx6Fsc

The Cars songs
Songs written by Ric Ocasek
Song recordings produced by Roy Thomas Baker
1979 songs